Fernando Yamada (born 17 February 1979) is a Brazilian former goalkeeper.

Honours

Corinthians
Copa São Paulo de Futebol Júnior: 1999
FIFA Club World Cup: 2000
Campeonato Paulista: 2001

ABC
Taça Cidade de Natal: 2010
Campeonato Potiguar: 2010

References

1979 births
Living people
Footballers from São Paulo
Brazilian footballers
Association football goalkeepers
Sport Club Corinthians Paulista players
Esporte Clube São Bento players
Brazil youth international footballers
Brazilian people of Japanese descent